Group Dynamics: Theory, Research, and Practice is a peer-reviewed academic journal published by Division 49 of the American Psychological Association. The journal was created in 1997 and includes research on group dynamics, defined by the editors as "the scientific study of all aspects of groups." The current editor-in-chief is David K. Marcus of Washington State University.

Abstracting and indexing 
According to the Journal Citation Reports, the journal has a 2020 impact factor of 0.759.

References

External links 
 

American Psychological Association academic journals
English-language journals